Sun Shilin (Chinese: 孙世林; born 24 October 1988 in Dalian) is a Chinese football player who currently plays for Chinese Super League side Shanghai Shenhua.

Club career
In 2006, Sun Shilin started his professional footballer career with Harbin Yiteng in the China League Two. In February 2011, Sun transferred to China League Two side Fushun Xinye.

In January 2012, Sun transferred to Chinese Super League side Liaoning Whowin. In February 2012，he moved to China League One side Fujian Smart Hero on a one-year loan deal. He made his league debut for Liaoning on 18 May 2013 in a game against Guangzhou Evergrande, coming on as a substitute for Pablo Brandán in the 79th minute. On 20 March 2015, he received a ban of three months by Chinese Football Association for age falsification which he changed his age from 24 October 1988 to 24 October 1989.

On 1 December 2016, Sun moved to fellow Super League side Shanghai Shenhua. On 8 February 2017, he made his debut in the 2017 AFC Champions League qualifying play-off against Brisbane Roar in a 2-0 defeat. He made his league debut for Shanghai on 5 March 2017 in a 4–0 home victory against Jiangsu Suning, coming on as a substitute for Cao Yunding in the 72nd minute. On 11 March 2017, Sun put his hand on Alexandre Pato's shoulder and gave him a thumbs-up sign after Pato lost a penalty in a league match against Tianjin Quanjian. He was charged for his unsporting conduct and received a ban of two matches on 24 March 2017.

Career statistics 
Statistics accurate as of match played 3 January 2022.

Honours

Club
Shanghai Shenhua
Chinese FA Cup: 2017, 2019

References

External links
 

1988 births
Living people
Chinese footballers
Footballers from Dalian
Zhejiang Yiteng F.C. players
Liaoning F.C. players
Cangzhou Mighty Lions F.C. players
Shanghai Shenhua F.C. players
Association football midfielders
Chinese Super League players
China League One players
China League Two players